The 1998 Adana–Ceyhan earthquake occurred at 16:55 local time on 27 June with a moment magnitude of 6.3 and a maximum intensity of IX (Destructive) on the European macroseismic scale. The total economic loss was estimated at about US$1 billion.

The event occurred in Cilicia region in southern Turkey and killed at least 145 people and left 1,500 people wounded and many thousands homeless in Adana, and Ceyhan, the most populous town of the Adana Province, as well as many villages located between both cities along the Ceyhan River. The most casualties and damage occurred due to inadequately engineered buildings in the town of Ceyhan.

See also 
List of earthquakes in 1998
List of earthquakes in Turkey

References

Further reading

External links
 Structural damage in 27 June 1998 Adana–Ceyhan earthquake
 M6.3 – central Turkey – United States Geological Survey
 

1998 Adana
1998 in Turkey
1998 earthquakes
1998
1998
June 1998 events in Asia
1998 disasters in Turkey